The Workmen's Compensation (Supplementation) Act 1951 was an Act of the Parliament of the United Kingdom. It was passed during the Labour government of Clement Attlee. It tackled the problem of the "pre-1924" compensation cases by enabling supplementary weekly allowances to be paid to workmen who had suffered workplace injuries from before 1924 in order to bring their compensation broadly to the same level as that payable to "post-1923" men.

Notes

United Kingdom Acts of Parliament 1951